Shad Mahalleh (also Romanized as Shād Maḩalleh; also known as Shāh Maḩalleh) is a village in Pain Khiyaban-e Litkuh Rural District, in the Central District of Amol County, Mazandaran Province, Iran. At the 2006 census, its population was 572, in 145 families.

References 

Populated places in Amol County